Robert Carey  (1821–1883) was a Major-General in the British Army, and served as Colonel in the New Zealand Wars.

Biography

Youth
Robert Carey was born to Octavius Carey and Harriot Hirzel Carey (née Le Marchant) of Castel, Guernsey on 12 December 1821.  He was educated there at Elizabeth College from 1833 to 1834.

Afghanistan and Punjab
In 1839 he was gazetted as an Ensign in the 40th regiment.  He was promoted to Lieutenant in 1841, and from 1841 to 1842 served in the Afghan war with Sir William Nott's force, taking part in the actions of Bolan Pass, Khojak Pass, Quetta, Ghuznee, and Kandahar. He participated in the relief of Killar Shilgie, the occupation of Kabul, and in further actions at Kabul and Khyber Pass (Punjab and First Sikh War). He was awarded clasps for Kandahar, Ghuznee and Kabul, and received the 1842 Afghan medal.

Crimea
Carey was promoted to Captain in 1847, and in 1854 served in the Crimean War as the Acting Quartermaster-General with the Turkish Contingent, and then commanding a Brigade (Brevet of Major).  He was awarded the 4th class Medjidie and the Turkish medal.

Promotions and marriage
He was promoted to Major in 1856, and on 31 December of that same year married Caroline Le Marchant, with whom he had three sons; Robert, Denis and Walter.  In 1859 he was promoted to Lieutenant-Colonel.

Australia and New Zealand
Carey served as Deputy Adjutant General (D.A.G.) in Australia in 1860, and served in the New Zealand Wars of 1860–1861 in New Zealand where he was recognised for his services as a Companion in the Most Honourable Order of the Bath. He was D.A.G. for the forces in the Waikato district in 1863, and was promoted to Colonel for the action of Rangiriri in the Invasion of the Waikato of 1863–1865, and also in the actions at Paterangi, Te Awamutu, Orakau, Pukehinahina and Mukimam.  He was involved in the Campaign of 1866, including the capture of Otapawa and Waikato, and operations around Mount Egmont in the Second Taranaki War, and was awarded a medal.

Retirement
Carey retired as Major-General in 1866.  He served as Deputy Judge Advocate at Headquarters from 1870 to 1882, and was a recipient of the Distinguished Service Award.

Death
Carey died on 25 January 1883, aged 61.

References
 The History of the Carey Family of Guernsey A.D. 1393–2007 website: Gallery: Robert Carey Ee3

1821 births
1883 deaths
Guernsey people
British Army major generals
Companions of the Order of the Bath
British military personnel of the First Anglo-Afghan War
British military personnel of the First Anglo-Sikh War
British Army personnel of the Crimean War
British military personnel of the New Zealand Wars
Military leaders of the New Zealand Wars
People educated at Elizabeth College, Guernsey
South Lancashire Regiment officers